Paolo di Girolamo (born 22 January 1994) is an Italian lightweight rower. He won a gold medal at the 2013 World Rowing Championships in Chungju with the lightweight men's eight.

Di Girolamo is an athlete of the Centro Sportivo Carabinieri.

Achievements

References

1994 births
Living people
Italian male rowers
World Rowing Championships medalists for Italy